Wheel alignment, which is sometimes referred to as breaking or tracking, is part of standard automobile maintenance that consists of adjusting the angles of wheels to the car manufacturer specifications. The purpose of these adjustments is to reduce tire wear and to ensure that vehicle travel is straight and true (without "pulling" to one side). Alignment angles can also be altered beyond the maker's specifications to obtain a specific handling characteristic. Motorsport and off-road applications may call for angles to be adjusted well beyond normal, for a variety of reasons.

Primary angles 

The primary angles are the basic angle alignment of the wheels relative to each other and to the car body. These adjustments are the camber, caster and toe. On some cars, not all of these can be adjusted on every wheel.

These three parameters can be further categorized into front and rear (with no caster on the rear, typically not being steered wheels). In summary, the parameters are:

 Front: Caster (left & right)
 Front: Camber (left & right)
 Front: Toe (left, right & total)
 Rear: Camber (left & right)
 Rear: Toe (left, right & total)

Secondary angles 

The secondary angles include numerous other adjustments, such as:
 SAI (Steering Axis Inclination)
 Included angle
 Toe out on turns
 Maximum Turns
 Toe curve change
 Track width difference
 Wheelbase difference
 Front ride height
 Rear ride height
 Frame angle
 Setback

Setback is the difference between right side and left side wheelbase length. It can also be measured as an angle. Setback less than the manufacturer specified tolerance (for example, about 6mm) does not affect car handling. This is because when the vehicle is turning, one wheel is ahead of the other by several centimetres and therefore the setback is negligible. There are some car models with different factory setting for right and left side wheelbase length, for various design reasons. An off-spec setback may occur because of a collision or a difference between right and left caster.

Rake is the difference between the front and rear ride heights, a positive number when the rear ride height is larger.

Measurement 

A camera unit (sometimes called a "head") is attached to a specially designed clamp which holds on to a wheel.  There are usually four camera units in a wheel alignment system (a camera unit for each wheel). The camera units communicate their physical positioning with respect to other camera units to a central computer, which calculates and displays. 

Often with alignment equipment, these "heads" can be a large precision reflector. In this case, the alignment "tower" contains the cameras as well as arrays of LEDs. This system flashes one array of LEDs for each reflector, whilst a camera centrally located in the LED array "looks for" an image of the reflectors patterned face. These cameras perform the same function as the other style of alignment equipment, yet alleviate numerous issues prone to relocating a heavy precision camera assembly on each vehicle serviced.

Camber 
Camber is the angle which the vertical axis of the wheel makes with the vertical axis of the vehicle. This angle is very important for the cornering performance of the vehicles. Generally, a Camber around   0.5-2 degrees is given on the vehicles. Depending  upon wheel orientation, Camber can be of three types.

1. Positive Camber

The Camber would be called positive when the top of the wheels lean outwards. Positive Camber is generally used in off-road vehicles. This is because, it improves the steering response and  decreases the steering efforts  required for turning the vehicle. Positive Camber is also provided in load carrying vehicles. This is because the heavy load on these vehicles cause outward leaning wheels to straighten up, improving the vehicle stability.

2. Zero Camber

The vehicle is said to have zero Camber when the wheels stand perfectly  straight on the ground.

3. Negative Camber

Negative Camber is encountered when the top of the wheels lean inwards. Providing Negative Camber improves the cornering performance. When the vehicle turns on a corner, it performs a circular motion. Hence, it experiences  equal and opposite centripetal &  centrifugal forces. The centripetal force is experienced in the form of friction on tyres. The centrifugal force experienced by the car tries to throw it away from the turning center. This increases the normal reaction on the outer wheels. 
Due to increase in normal reaction, the frictional force on the outer tyres also increase. This friction acts as centripetal force and tries to bend the outer tires inwards. The tires get deformed due to bending and the contact area between the wheels and the ground decreases. This in turns decreases the frictional force between the outer tires and the ground, causing the vehicle to drift during cornering. Hence a negative Camber is given to the vehicles. The negatively cambered wheels lean inwards. So during cornering when the frictional forces try to deform the outer wheels, they just simply get flat on ground, increasing the friction with the road surface.

Signs of a bad wheel alignment 

 The vehicle pulls to one side
 The steering wheel does not return to center
 The steering wheel is off-center
 Excessive tire wear in certain spots
 Loose steering

See also 

 Auto mechanic
 ASE
 Car handling
 Car maintenance
 Tire balance
 Tire rotation

References

Motor vehicle maintenance
Vehicle dynamics
Alignment